The 1912 Maine Black Bears football team was an American football team that represented the University of Maine as an independent during the 1912 college football season. The team compiled a 7–1 record and shut out six of its eight opponents. Its only setback was a 7–0 loss on the road against national champion, Harvard. Thomas J. Riley was the coach, and Thomas Shepard was the team captain.

Schedule

References

Maine
Maine Black Bears football seasons
Maine Black Bears football